Ephelis cruentalis is a species of moth in the family Crambidae. It was described by Carl Geyer in 1832. It is found in southern Europe, from France east to Italy and Greece to Turkey and further east into central Asia.

The wingspan is 18–23 mm.

The larvae feed on Hypericum species (St. John's worts).

References

Odontiini
Moths of Europe
Moths described in 1832
Insects of Turkey